Lindsey Denise Pulliam (born August 6, 1999) is an American professional basketball for CB Estudiantes of the Spanish top-tier Liga Femenina de Baloncesto. She was drafted by the Atlanta Dream in the third round of the 2021 WNBA Draft.

Pulliam was born in Washington, D.C. She grew up in Silver Spring, Maryland and attended high school at Our Lady of Good Counsel in Olney, Maryland.

Northwestern
Pulliam was a four-star recruit going into college. She played college basketball at Northwestern University. Over four years, she started 123 games and averaged 16.5 points per game on a .379 shooting percentage. She had 120 steals and 25 blocks.

Pulliam is only the third Northwestern player to score 2,000 points. She was the fastest Wildcat to 1,000 points. She guided Northwestern to a regular-season Big 10 title in 2020 and an NCAA Tournament berth in 2021, when the team reached the Round of 32 for the first time since 1993. She was named to the All-Big Ten First Team in 2020 and the All-Big Ten Second Team in 2021. She was an AP All American Honorable Mention in 2020. She was a 2021 finalist for the Wooden Award.

Northwestern statistics
Source

Professional career
Pulliam was drafted by the Atlanta Dream in the 2021 WNBA draft. She was cut on May 9 of that year.

In August 2021, she signed with Elazığ İl Özel İdarespor of the Turkish Women's Basketball Super League (KBSL) where she averaged 14.7 points, 3.5 rebounds and 1.8 assists in 12 KBSL games. In 7 EuroCup games, she averaged 13.9 points, 5.9 rebounds and 2.9 assists.

Prior to the 2021-2022 season, Pulliam signed with CB Estudiantes of the Spanish top-tier Liga Femenina de Baloncesto.

National team career
Pulliam won a silver medal for Team USA at the 2019 Pan American Games. During the tournament, she averaged 3.7 and 1.3 rebounds.

References 

1999 births
Living people
Atlanta Dream draft picks
Basketball players from Maryland
Basketball players from Washington, D.C.
Guards (basketball)
Northwestern Wildcats women's basketball players
People from Silver Spring, Maryland
Basketball players at the 2019 Pan American Games
Pan American Games silver medalists for the United States
Pan American Games medalists in basketball
Medalists at the 2019 Pan American Games